Aravalli may refer to:

 Aravalli Range, a Mountain range in North-West India
 Aravalli, West Godavari, a village in Andhra Pradesh, India
 Aravalli district, a district in the state of Gujarat in India
 Aravalli (film), released in 1957